Baz is a surname, given name and nickname, often a short form (hypocorism) of Basil or Barry. It may refer to:


People

Surname
Ben-Hur Baz (1906–2003), Mexican painter of pin-up art
Cristian Baz (born 1987), Argentine footballer
Gustavo Baz Prada (1894–1987), Mexican politician
Ignacio Baz (1826–1887), Argentine portrait painter
Jamil Baz, chief investment strategist of GLG Partners, a London-based hedge fund, and economics professor
Loris Baz (born 1993), French motorcycle racer
Marysole Wörner Baz (born 1936), Mexican painter and sculptor
Molly Baz, American chef and food writer
Nabil Baz (born 1987), Algerian racing cyclist
Shane Baz (born 1999), American baseball player
Rashid Baz, perpetrator of the 1994 Brooklyn Bridge shooting

Given name
Baz Mohammad Ahmadi, Deputy Minister of Interior for Counter-Narcotics and former Governor of Badakhshan, Afghanistan
Baz Bamigboye, British journalist
Baz Muhammad Khan, Pakistani politician
Baz Moffat (born 1978), British female rower

Nickname
Bazil Ashmawy (born 1975), Irish television personality
Sebastian Bach (born 1968), Canadian heavy metal singer
Baz Bastien (1919–1983), Canadian National Hockey League goaltender, head coach and general manager
Baz Luhrmann (born 1962), Australian filmmaker
Brendon McCullum (born 1981), New Zealand cricketer
Baz Nagle (1933–1997), Canadian Football League player
Barry North (born 1959), British Royal Air Force air marshal
Basil O'Meara (1892–1971), Canadian sports journalist
Barry Thomson, guitarist and co-founder of the British death metal band Bolt Thrower
Baz Warne (born 1964), lead and bass guitarist and vocalist of the punk rock band The Stranglers
Barry Du Bois (born 1960), Australian designer, building expert, television presenter and author

Fictional characters
Baz Pitch, in the novel Carry On by Rainbow Rowell, boyfriend to Simon Snow
Simon Baz, a DC Comics character
Barbara "Baz" Wilder, a former character on the British TV series Casualty
The Baz, a recurring character in Divekick and other kickstarter indie games

See also

Mar Narsai D'Baz (1940-2010), Metropolitan of Lebanon, Syria and all Europe in the Assyrian Church of the East
El-Baz, an Arabic surname and, as Elbaz, a Hebrew surname

Hypocorisms
Lists of people by nickname